Eois marcearia is a moth in the  family Geometridae. It is found in the Amazon region, including Brazil, as well as in Trinidad.

References

Moths described in 1858
Eois
Moths of the Caribbean
Moths of South America